Moreh (Meitei pronunciation: /mō-rey/) is an international border town located on the India–Myanmar border in Tengnoupal district of the Indian state of Manipur.
As a rapidly developing international trade point with the integrated customs and international immigration checkpoint, Moreh plays a very important role in India's Look East Policy, trade and commerce under ASEAN–India Free Trade Area, India-Myanmar relationship, India–Myanmar–Thailand road connectivity, and Trans-Asian Railway connectivity.

Tamu in Myanmar, just across the Menal river from Moreh, is connected to Moreh via 2 road bridges: The Indo-Myanmar Friendship Bridge and a newer Moreh ICP Bridge which connects the Moreh Integrated Check Post (Moreh ICP). Tamu in Myanmar connects Moreh in India to Kalewa-Yagyi-Mandalay in Myanmar and Mae Sot in Thailand through the India–Myanmar–Thailand Trilateral Highway.

Demography 

In the 2011 India census, Moreh had a population of 16,847. Males were 8,670 while 8,177 were females. Moreh had an average literacy rate of 71.47%, lower than the state average of 76.94%: male literacy was around 79.52%, and female literacy was 62.88%. In Moreh, 14.58% of the population was under 6 years of age. The female sex ratio was 943 compared with the state average of 985. The child sex ratio was around 985 compared with the Manipur state average of 930.

Economy 

Being a border trade and transit town, Moreh plays a key role in the development of the economy of the state with border haat as well as international trade. A significant portion of the economy of Moreh depends on smuggling, including illegal teak smuggled from Myanmar.

Border haat 
Moreh has the local Border Haat trade, under the India-Myanmar Barter Trade mechanism, in which over 40 tradable items are listed. Major exports include cement, engineering goods, transport equipment, motor cycles, iron and steels, medicine, chemicals and allied products, cotton yarn, etc. The major items now imported from Myanmar through barter mechanism are betel nuts, turmeric, red kidney beans (Rajma), kuth roots, gram, resin, dry ginger, etc.

International trade 

India's Ministry of Finance has also operationalised the "normal international trade" through Moreh Integrated Check Post (Moreh ICP).

Transport 

India is part of BIMSTEC, East Asia Summit, Mekong-Ganga Cooperation, United Nations Economic and Social Commission for Asia and the Pacific, Asian Highway Network and the Trans-Asian Railway network and India has embarked on several Look-East connectivity projects.

Integrated Check Post (ICP) 

Moreh ICP, costing Rs. 136 crores on  land near Gate No.1 within Customs notified area, facilitates speedy movement of export-import consignments under India's Look East Policy. ICP has Immigration Department, Narcotics & Drug Control Department, Land Customs Department, Customs Preventive Department, Animal Quarantine, Plant Quarantine, local Police including Women Constables, Quality Certification Inspection Agencies and Export Promotion Councils, Trade Facilitation Counter and Trade related Public Bodies, Food Testing Lab, Postal Department, Forests Department, bank counter, telecom, truck parking, staff quarters, basic amenities such as canteen, truck drivers’ rest house, etc.

Airport 

Imphal Airport (110 km northwest of Moreh) is the nearest airport in India. Homalin Airport (120 km north) and Kalaymyo Airport (133 km south) are the nearest airport in Myanmar.

AH1 and India-Thailand Highway

Moreh is on the Asian Highway 1 (AH1), which is the longest route of the Asian Highway Network, running 20,557 km (12,774 mi) from Tokyo, Japan via Korea, China, Southeast Asia, Bangladesh, India, Pakistan, Afghanistan and Iran to the border between Turkey and Bulgaria west of Istanbul where it joins end-on with European route E80, running all the way to Lisbon, Portugal.

It will boost India's trade and commerce with ASEAN under ASEAN–India Free Trade Area. Imphal-Moreh route Its upgrade was already complete by 2017, however it is further being upgraded to Asian Highway Standard in 3 packages, one of which was complete and remaining 2 will be completed by 2023 as per November 2020 status update. In November 2020, Bangladesh expressed interest to join this Highway. India plans to upgrade route from Zokhawthar in Mizoram to Tedim in Chin State of Myanmar as an additional connect to the IMT trilateral highway.

Trans-Asian Railway

Trans-Asian Railway's (TAR) Southern Corridor (also called ITI-DKD-Y), once completed, will connect Yunnan in China and Thailand with Europe via India and Turkey. As of 2021, all freight traffic from Asia to Europe goes by sea. TAR will enable containers from Singapore, China, Vietnam, Cambodia, India, Bangladesh, Myanmar, Thailand and Korea to travel over land by train to Europe. The proposed route will enter India at Moreh from Tamu in Myanmar, then enter Bangladesh through Mahisasan and Shahbajpur and again enter India from Bangladesh at Gede. On the western side, the line will enter Pakistan at Attari. 

To bridge the missing gap in the TAR's ITI-DKD-Y route, India and Myanmar plan to interconnect their railway networks via a  line that will extend under-construction Jiribam-Imphal line to Moreh-Tamu border and then to existing Kalay railhead in Myanmar.  of the missing link, from Jiribam to Moreh-Tamu on Myanmar border, falls in India, out of which  Jiribam–Imphal line is under construction, and remaining  Imphal-Moreh line is under planning. Japan was conducting feasibility for the  Moreh-Tamu-Kalay link in Myanmar.

Jiribam–Imphal line

Jiribam–Imphal line, 111 km long line, has a likely completion date of December 2023 as per August 2021 status update.

Imphal–Moreh-Kalay line

Imphal–Moreh-Kalay line,  the Jiribam–Imphal line will be extended nearly 70 km to Moreh on the India–Myanmar border. Under the Look East policy of India, the line will be extended from Moreh to the existing railhead of Myanmar rail network at Kalay (also called Kale and Kalemyo) to form part of the ambitious Trans-Asian Railway. Indian plans to extend Imphal rail link to Moreh and eventually to the Myanmar railway system, allowing onward connectivity to Thailand and China. In 2007, plan for Imphal-Moreh was expressed by India. In January 2018, India initiated a preliminary survey to determine the feasibility of establishing a rail link parallel to the India–Myanmar–Thailand Trilateral Highway. Japan expressed interest in collaborating with India and funding the proposed rail link.

See also 

 Borders of India

Notes

References 

Cities and towns in Chandel district
India–Myanmar border crossings
Chandel, Manipur